This list of British music hall performers includes a related list of British Variety entertainers...

Music Hall and Variety
Music Hall, Britain's first form of commercial mass entertainment, emerged, broadly speaking, in the mid-19th century, and ended (arguably) after the First World War, when the halls rebranded their entertainment as Variety. Perceptions of a distinction in Britain between bold and scandalous Victorian Music Hall and subsequent, more respectable Variety may differ (in the US, Burlesque and Vaudeville have analogous connotations).

British Music Hall entertainers

 Annie Adams (1843–1905)
 Fred Albert (1844–1886)
Charles Austin (1878–1944)
 Wilkie Bard (1874–1944)
 Fred Barnes (1885-1938)
 Ida Barr (1882–1967)
 T. W. Barrett (1851–1935)
 George Beauchamp (1862–1900)
 Harry Bedford (1873-1939)
 Bessie Bellwood (1856–1896)
 Ada Blanche (1862–1953)
 Bessie Bonehill (1855–1902)
 Herbert Campbell (1844–1904)
 Kate Carney (1869–1950)
 Mrs Caulfield (1817–1870)
 Harry Champion (1865–1942)
 Charles Chaplin Sr. (1863–1901)
 Hannah Chaplin (1865–1928)
 Albert Chevalier (1861–1923)
 G. H. Chirgwin (1854–1922)
 Tom Clare (1876–1946)
 Harry Clifton (1832–1872)
 Charles Coborn (1852–1945)
 Lottie Collins (1865–1910)
 Sam Collins (1825–1865)
 Kitty Colyer (1881–1972)
 Margaret Cooper (1877–1922) 
 Sam Cowell (1820–1864)
 Whit Cunliffe (1875–1966)
 Marie Dainton (1881–1938; half-Russian)
 Daisy Dormer (1883–1947)
 Leo Dryden (1863–1939)
 T. E. Dunville (1867–1924)
 Gus Elen (1862–1940)
 G. H. Elliott (1882–1962)
 Kate Everleigh (1864–1926)
 James Fawn (1850–1923)
 George Formby Sr (1875–1921)
 Tom Foy (1879–1917)
 Harry Fragson (1869–1913)
 Will Fyffe (1885–1947)
 Barclay Gammon (1866–1915)
 Gertie Gitana (1887–1957)
 Robert Glindon (c. 1799–1866)
 Charles Godfrey (1854–1900)
 Ernest Hastings (1879–1940)
 Dick Henderson (1891–1958)
 May Henderson (1884–1937)
 Jenny Hill (1848–1896)
 Thomas Hudson (1791–1844)
 Alec Hurley (1871–1913)
 Jack Judge (1872–1938)
 Marie Kendall (1873–1964)
 Hetty King (1883–1972)
 John Labern (c. 1815–1881)
 Walter Laburnum (1847–1902)
 George Lashwood (1863–1942)
 Harry Lauder (1870–1950)
 John Lawson (1865–1920)
 Dan Leno (1860–1904)
 Fannie Leslie (1856–1935)
 George Leybourne (1842–1884)
 George Leyton (1864–1948)
 Letty Lind (1861–1923)
 Millie Lindon (1869–1940)
 Victor Liston (1838–1913)
 Alice Lloyd (1873–1949)
 Arthur Lloyd (1839–1904)
 Marie Lloyd (1870–1922)
 Tommy Lorne (1890–1935)
 G. H. MacDermott (1845–1901)
 E. W. Mackney (1825–1909)
 Clarice Mayne (1886–1966)
 Ernie Mayne (1871–1937)
 Jack Mayne (1887-1963) Comedian (name George Albert Caley) 
 Sam Mayo (1881–1938)
 Billy Merson (1879–1947)
 Victoria Monks (1884–1927)
 Lily Morris (1882–1952)
 Jolly John Nash (1828–1901)
 Harry Nicholls (1852–1926)
 Talbot O'Farrell (1878–1952)
 Joe O'Gorman (1863–1937)
 Denise Orme (1885–1960)
 Charles Penrose (1873–1952)
 Mrs F. R. Phillips (c. 1829–1899)
 Jack Pleasants (1875–1924)
 Nelly Power (1854–1887)
 Arthur Prince (1881–1946)
 Harry Randall (1857–1932)
 Ada Reeve (1874–1966)
 Ella Retford (1885–1962)
 J. W. Rickaby (1870–1929)
 Arthur Roberts (1852–1933)
 George Robey (1869–1954)
 Frederick Robson (1821–1864)
 Austin Rudd (1868–1929)
 Maidie Scott (1881–1966)
 Malcolm Scott (1872–1929)
 Jack Selbini (1854–1932)
 Mark Sheridan (1864–1918)
 Ella Shields (1879–1952)
 J. H. Stead (c. 1827–1866)
 Eugene Stratton (1861–1918)
 Marie Studholme (1872–1930)
 Randolph Sutton (1888–1969)
 Harry Sydney (c. 1825–1870)
 Harry Tate (1872–1940)
 Little Tich (1867–1928)
 Vesta Tilley (1864–1952)
 Sam Torr (1849–1923)
 Alfred Vance (1839–1888)
 Harriet Vernon (1852–1923)
 Vesta Victoria (1873–1951)
 Harry Weldon (1881–1930)
 Bessie Wentworth (1873–1901)
 Mabel Whittaker (1888-1963) (Dancer) The Rainbow Girl 
 Charles Whittle (1874–1947)
 Daisy Wood (1877–1961)
 Wee Georgie Wood (1894–1979)
 Tom Woottwell (1864–1941)

British Music Hall entertainers: gallery

British Variety entertainers

 Arthur Askey (1900–1982)
 Billy Bennett (1887–1942)
 Issy Bonn (1903–1977)
 Max Bygraves (1922–2012)
 Charlie Chester (1914–1997)
 Ken Dodd (1927–2018)
 Clive Dunn (1920–2012)
 Sid Field (1904–1950)
 Gracie Fields (1898–1979)
 Flanagan and Allen (respectively: 1896–1968; 1894–1982)
 Flanders and Swann (respectively: 1922–1975; 1923–1994)
 George Formby (1904–1961)
 Bruce Forsyth (1928–2017)
 Dickie Henderson (1922–1985)
 Joan Hinde (1933–2015)
 Hinge and Bracket: G. Logan (b. 1944) & P. Fyffe (1942–2002)
 Stanley Holloway (1890–1982)
 Roy Hudd (1936–2020)
 Jack Hylton (1892–1965)
 Jewel and Warriss (respectively: 1909–1995; 1909–1993)
 Davy Kaye (1916–1998)
 Danny La Rue (1927–2009)
 Kenneth McKellar (1927–2010)
 Max Miller (1894–1963)
 Ivor Novello (1893–1951)
 Joe O'Gorman (1890–1974)
 Tessie O'Shea (1913–1995)
 Bob and Alf Pearson (respectively: 1907–1985; 1910–2012)
 Frank Randle (1901–1957)
 Ted Ray (1905–1977)
 Leslie Sarony (1897–1985)
 Andy Stewart (1933–1993)
 Tommy Trinder (1909–1989)
 Max Wall (1908–1990)
 Jimmy Wheeler (1910–1973)
 Robb Wilton (1881–1957)

British Variety entertainers: gallery

See also

 Music hall
 Music of the United Kingdom
 Theatre of the United Kingdom

References

Music hall performers
Music hall